Edward Denny  was an Irish politician.

Denny was born in County Kerry and educated at  Trinity College, Dublin.

Deny  represented Askeaton from 1715 to 1727.

References

Irish MPs 1715–1727
Members of the Parliament of Ireland (pre-1801) for County Kerry constituencies
18th-century Irish people
Alumni of Trinity College Dublin
People from County Kerry